Michael John Horak (born 3 June 1977) is a South African former rugby union and rugby league footballer who played in the 1990s, 2000s and 2010s, and rugby union coach. He represented South Africa in rugby league, and played one game for England in rugby union. He last played at fullback or wing for Saracens.

Background
Michael Horak was born in Johannesburg, South Africa.

Career

Playing career

After playing for the Free State Schools Craven Week side in 1995 and the Free State U21s in 1996 he moved to Australia to play rugby league, and played for the Perth Reds. He has also played for South Africa, including at the 1997 Super League World Nines.

Horak was signed by Bob Dwyer for the Leicester Tigers in 1997 and became Leicester's first-choice full back, replacing the retiring John Liley and ahead of Fijian international Waisale Serevi. He also played for the England U21 side. However, he dropped to third choice after Tiger's signing of Tim Stimpson and Geordan Murphy.

Horak subsequently followed Dwyer to Bristol before signing for London Irish in 1999. He left Irish in 2000 but re-signed in 2001.

He started in the 2002 Powergen Cup Final at Twickenham, scoring a try as London Irish defeated the Northampton Saints.

His solitary England cap came during the tour of Argentina, on 22 June 2002 at the Estadio José Amalfitani. He qualifies for England via his English mother.

After spending two seasons with Benetton Treviso, Horak signed with Saracens for the 2009–10 season but announced his retirement with immediate effect in January 2010.
He is a tall player with a big left boot.

Coaching career

In 2010,  head coach Naka Drotské appointed Horak as the defence coach and head of the Cheetahs academy prior to the 2010 Currie Cup Premier Division competition.

References

External links
Saracens profile
Scrum.com player statistics
London Irish profile

1977 births
Living people
Alumni of Grey College, Bloemfontein
Bristol Bears players
Dual-code rugby internationals
England international rugby union players
Expatriate rugby league players in Australia
Expatriate rugby union players in England
Expatriate rugby union players in Italy
Leicester Tigers players
London Irish players
Rugby league fullbacks
Rugby league players from Gauteng
Rugby union fullbacks
Rugby union players from Johannesburg
Saracens F.C. players
South Africa national rugby league team players
South African expatriate rugby league players
South African expatriate rugby union players
South African expatriate sportspeople in Australia
South African expatriate sportspeople in England
South African expatriate sportspeople in Italy
South African people of English descent
South African people of Slavic descent
South African rugby league players
South African rugby union coaches
South African rugby union players